Elizabeth (Betsy) Baldwin Garland was an American archaeologist known for her expertise on Great Lakes prehistory and the archaeology of Michigan. She was the author of a number of scholarly publications.

Biography
Garland earned  a BS in geology from Wellesley College, an MA in Anthropology from Radcliffe College, and a PhD from Harvard in anthropology in 1967.

In 1964, Garland was offered a teaching position in the anthropology department at Western Michigan University (WMU). She was the first archaeologist on the faculty at WMU. In 1966, Garland helped create WMU's archaeology program in the department of anthropology, as well as a joint field school with Michigan State University.

Garland led numerous excavations in Michigan, including several surveys of the Kalamazoo River basin.
She founded a chapter of the  Michigan Archaeological Society and was named president of the Conference on Michigan Archaeology in 1976. She served as president of the Archaeology Conference until 1980.

"Among the accomplishments Garland is noted for, is her work with students. Garland became a powerful mentor to many students, particularly women, who have gone on to pursue careers in archaeology".

Garland retired from teaching in 1992. In 2002, Garland was named Outstanding Emeritus Scholar by Western Michigan University.

Select publications

References 

American archaeologists
American women archaeologists
Wellesley College alumni
Radcliffe College alumni
Western Michigan University faculty
Living people
1930 births
American women academics
21st-century American women